The Southeastern Conference Baseball Coach of the Year is an award given to the most outstanding baseball head coach in the Southeastern Conference, as chosen by Southeastern Conference Coaches.

Key

Winners

Winners by school

Footnotes
 Georgia Tech left the Southeastern Conference in 1964.
 Tulane left the Southeastern Conference in 1966.

See also
Southeastern Conference Baseball Player of the Year
Southeastern Conference Baseball Pitcher of the Year
Southeastern Conference Baseball Freshman of the Year

References

NCAA Division I baseball conference coaches of the year
Coach
Awards established in 1933
1933 establishments in the United States